Pukamuqu (Quechua, puka red, muqu hill / joint, "red hill") is a mountain in Peru. It is situated in the Cusco Region, Cusco Province, Cusco District. On top of the mountain there is a statue called Cristo Blanco (Spanish for "white Christ").

References 

Mountains of Cusco Region
Monuments and memorials in Peru
Colossal statues of Jesus
Mountains of Peru